USS Radiant is a name used more than once by the United States Navy, and may refer to:

 , the proposed naval designation for the civilian tug Radiant, which was registered for possible naval service during World War I but never commissioned
 , a coastal minesweeper in commission from 1942 to 1945

United States Navy ship names